Randolph and Arch is a light rail stop on the Muni Metro M Ocean View line, located in the Ingleside Heights neighborhood of San Francisco, California. The stop opened with the line on October 6, 1925. The line was replaced with buses on August 6, 1939, but streetcar service resumed on December 17, 1944. The station has transit bulbs which extend the sidewalk of Randolph Street, to meet trains like a side platform, allowing passengers to board or depart from trains. The stops are located just after trains cross Arch Street and include mini-high platforms which provide access to people with disabilities.

The stop is also served by the  route which provides service along the M Ocean View line during the early morning when trains do not operate.

References

External links 

SFMTA – Randolph St & Arch St inbound and outbound
SFBay Transit (unofficial) – Randolph St & Arch St

Muni Metro stations
Railway stations in the United States opened in 1925